Helastia cinerearia is a moth of the family Geometridae. It is endemic to New Zealand.

Taxonomy
This species was first described by Doubleday in 1843 and named Cidaria cinerearia. In 1939 Louis Beethoven Prout placed this species in the genus Larentia. In 1971 J. S. Dugdale placed this species in the genus Helastia.

References

Moths of New Zealand
Endemic fauna of New Zealand
Moths described in 1843
Cidariini
Taxa named by Edward Doubleday
Endemic moths of New Zealand